Thomas Gibson Lea (December 14, 1785 – September 30, 1844) was an American botanist who was born in Wilmington, Delaware. He was the older brother of the publisher, Isaac Lea and the younger brother of John Lea (1782-1862), who is known for his study of a cholera outbreak in Cincinnati, Ohio.

He was honoured with Miles Joseph Berkeley (1803 - 1889), an English cryptogamist and clergyman in the naming of Berkleasmium (in 1854), which is a genus of fungi belonging to the family Dematiaceae.

References 

19th-century American botanists
People from Wilmington, Delaware
1785 births
1844 deaths